Pygomolpus is a genus of leaf beetles in the subfamily Eumolpinae. It contains only one species, Pygomolpus opacus, and is the only member of the tribe Pygomolpini. It was described by the Czech entomologist Jan Bechyné in 1949. It is found in Brazil, Paraguay and Argentina.

References

Eumolpinae
Monotypic Chrysomelidae genera
Beetles of South America